Adrián Chovan (born 8 October 1995) is a Slovak footballer who plays for Slovan Bratislava as a goalkeeper.

Club career

AS Trenčín
Chovan made his Fortuna Liga debut for AS Trenčín against Žilina on 13 May 2016.

Honours
Slovan Bratislava
Fortuna Liga: 2021–22

References

External links
 FK AS Trenčín official club profile
 
 Futbalnet profile

1995 births
Living people
People from Partizánske
Sportspeople from the Trenčín Region
Slovak footballers
Slovakia youth international footballers
Slovakia under-21 international footballers
Association football goalkeepers
AS Trenčín players
AFC Nové Mesto nad Váhom players
FC ViOn Zlaté Moravce players
ŠK Slovan Bratislava players
Slovak Super Liga players
2. Liga (Slovakia) players